Azerbaijani football in 2010

Azerbaijan Premier League

Championship group

Relegation group

Azerbaijan First Division

Azerbaijan Cup

National team

Goal scorers

Azerbaijani clubs in Europe

Summary

Baku

Qarabağ

Inter Baku

Simurq